Mahogany Rush was a Canadian rock band led by guitarist Frank Marino. Formed in Montreal, Quebec in 1969, the band had its peak of popularity in the 1970s, playing venues as large as California Jam II.

The band is perhaps best known for Marino's soaring lead guitar which bears a strong resemblance to the playing of Jimi Hendrix. Long-term members of the band have included bassist Paul Harwood and drummer Jimmy Ayoub, and Frank's brother Vince on guitar; Frank Marino is the sole continuous member of the band. Starting in the late 1970s, the group recorded and toured as Frank Marino & Mahogany Rush.

Musical style 
Marino has described the band's sound as "The Grateful Dead meets jazz".

Beginnings 
In an effort to gain press attention, the original record company created a fictional story that Frank Marino, prior to starting the band, had spent time in a mental institution after taking LSD and was visited by Jimi Hendrix in a vision.

Over time, the band migrated to a larger and more financially supported record company and achieved its greatest radio hit success with the song "Strange Dreams".

Members 
Last line-up
 Frank Marino – vocals, guitars, keyboards 
 Mick Layne – guitars 
 Avi Ludmer – violin, guitars 
 Dave Goode – drums 
 Mark Weber – bass 

Former members
 Paul Harwood – bass 
 Jimmy Ayoub – drums, percussion 
 Phil Bech – piano 
 Johnny McDiarmid – keyboards 
 Vince Marino – guitars 
 Timm Biery – drums 
 Claudio Daniel Pesavento – keyboards 
 Josh Trager – drums 
 Peter Dowse – bass

Discography 

Studio albums
1972 Maxoom (U.S. #159)
1974 Child of the Novelty (U.S. #74)
1975 Strange Universe (U.S. #84)
1976 Mahogany Rush IV (U.S. #175)
1977 World Anthem (U.S. #184)
1979 Tales of the Unexpected (U.S. #129)
1980 What's Next (U.S. #88)
1981 The Power of Rock 'n' Roll 
1982 Juggernaut (U.S. #185) 
1986 Full Circle 
1990 From the Hip 
2000 Eye of the Storm

Others
1978 Live (U.S. #129)
1988 Double Live
1996 Dragonfly – The best of Frank Marino & Mahogany Rush
2004 Real Live! (double album)
2005 Full Circle (remaster)
2005 From the Hip (remaster)
2008 Mahogany Rush IV / World Anthem (remaster)
2009 Mahogany Rush Live / Tales of the Unexpected / What's Next (remaster)
2012 The Power of Rock and Roll / Juggernaut (remaster)

Notes

References

External links 
 Official page

Canadian hard rock musical groups
Canadian heavy metal musical groups
Canadian psychedelic rock music groups
English-language musical groups from Quebec
Musical groups established in 1969
Musical groups from Montreal
1969 establishments in Quebec